Botryosphaeria marconii is a fungal plant pathogen that causes stalk and twig blight on hemp.

References

marconii
Fungal plant pathogens and diseases
Eudicot diseases
Fungi described in 1914